Silverdale is a village approximately 30 km north of Auckland in the North Island of New Zealand. It is located on the north bank of the Weiti River and lies to the west of the Whangaparaoa Peninsula.

State Highway 1 passes to the west of the village via the Northern Motorway. The former route of State Highway 1 runs south-west to north-east through the village. This route was redesignated State Highway 17 before being redesignated Hibiscus Coast Highway (part of Urban Route 31). This passes through Orewa and Waiwera before joining State Highway 1 at the termination of the motorway south of Puhoi.

Hibiscus Coast busway station is the northernmost station participating in the Northern Busway. It is located on the Hibiscus Coast Highway a few hundred metres south-west of Silverdale.

History

The township was established under the name Wade (a corruption of Weiti) but renamed Silverdale in 1911 because of the many poplar trees in the area at the time and because it is situated in a dale. The historic areas of Silverdale feature a number of 19th century buildings from when the township was established, including the Holy Trinity Anglican Church from 1885, and the Methodist Parsonage, built in 1887. The Wesleyan church was built in Parnell in the mid-1840s, and transported to Silverdale by sea c. 1856.

Demographics

Silverdale had a population of 2,283 at the 2018 New Zealand census, an increase of 198 people (9.5%) since the 2013 census, and an increase of 459 people (25.2%) since the 2006 census. There were 756 households, comprising 1,188 males and 1,095 females, giving a sex ratio of 1.08 males per female, with 411 people (18.0%) aged under 15 years, 414 (18.1%) aged 15 to 29, 1,212 (53.1%) aged 30 to 64, and 240 (10.5%) aged 65 or older.

Ethnicities were 86.6% European/Pākehā, 7.8% Māori, 1.4% Pacific peoples, 9.5% Asian, and 2.4% other ethnicities. People may identify with more than one ethnicity.

The percentage of people born overseas was 32.3, compared with 27.1% nationally.

Although some people chose not to answer the census's question about religious affiliation, 60.3% had no religion, 29.6% were Christian, 0.1% had Māori religious beliefs, 0.7% were Hindu, 0.1% were Muslim, 0.5% were Buddhist and 2.2% had other religions.

Of those at least 15 years old, 402 (21.5%) people had a bachelor's or higher degree, and 234 (12.5%) people had no formal qualifications. 441 people (23.6%) earned over $70,000 compared to 17.2% nationally. The employment status of those at least 15 was that 1,113 (59.5%) people were employed full-time, 294 (15.7%) were part-time, and 48 (2.6%) were unemployed.

Education
The school was founded in 1869 and moved to its current site at the end of 2006.

The Catholic school opened at the beginning of 2005.

Both schools are coeducational.

References

External links
 Silverdale School website
 Stella Maris Primary School website
 

Populated places in the Auckland Region
Hibiscus Coast
Hibiscus and Bays Local Board Area